William Hastings (22 August 1888 – after 1919) was an English professional footballer who scored seven goals in 40 appearances in the Second Division of the Football League playing for Birmingham. He also won the Southern League title with Brighton & Hove Albion in the 1909–10 season and with Watford in 1914–15. His main playing position was at outside left.

Hastings was born in West Hartlepool, County Durham, and played for Spennymoor United and West Hartlepool before moving south to join Brighton & Hove Albion in the summer of 1909. He missed only one game as the club won the Southern League title and the Southern Charity Cup in his first season, and set up Charlie Webb's goal as Albion beat reigning Football League champions Aston Villa in the 1910 FA Charity Shield. He moved to Second Division club Birmingham in February 1912 for a £100 fee. He never established himself as a first-choice player, and moved back to the Southern League with Watford in 1914, with whom he again won that league's championship in the last season before the First World War. After serving in the Royal Flying Corps, Hastings returned home to play a few games for North Eastern League club Hartlepools United. He later became a referee.

References

1888 births
Year of death missing
Place of death missing
People from West Hartlepool
Footballers from Hartlepool
English footballers
Association football forwards
Spennymoor United F.C. players
Brighton & Hove Albion F.C. players
Birmingham City F.C. players
Watford F.C. players
Hartlepool United F.C. players
Southern Football League players
English Football League players
West Hartlepool F.C. players